Pseudopanax gilliesii is a species of plant in the family Araliaceae. It is endemic, or native, to New Zealand.

References

Flora of New Zealand
gilliesii
Near threatened plants
Taxonomy articles created by Polbot